Eduard Heinl (born April 9, 1880 in Vienna, died on April 10, 1957) was an Austrian politician from the Christian Social Party and the Austrian People's Party who served as Vice-Chancellor of Austria in the First Austrian Republic from October 22, 1920 to November 20, 1920.

Awards
Wilhelm Exner Medal, 1951

External links
 Dr. h.c. Eduard Heinl - biography at Parliament of Austria website (German)

1880 births
1957 deaths
Politicians from Vienna
Austrian Roman Catholics
Christian Social Party (Austria) politicians
Austrian People's Party politicians
Vice-Chancellors of Austria
Members of the Constituent National Assembly (Austria) 
Members of the National Council (Austria)